Mirjalol Kushakovich Qosimov (in English also: Mirdjalal Kasimov or Kasymov) (born 17 September 1970) is a former head coach of the Uzbekistan national football team. He also played for the national team as a playmaker. Qosimov is currently the manager of AGMK.

Club career
Qosimov finished his career in 2005 with FK Mash'al Mubarek, which plays in Uzbek League. He played a vital role in Mash'al becoming runners-up during the 2005 Uzbek national football club championship, which was the club's best ever finish. 2005 he decided to finish his career. Kasimov previously starred for Pakhtakor and Alania Vladikavkaz in Russia. With 210 goals in his playing career, he is a member of Club 200 of Berador Abduraimov and Gennadi Krasnitsky club. He is one of the most successful and famous players of Uzbek football of the modern period.

Qosimov was the first Uzbekistani and the second Asian player after South Korean Cha Bum-Kun to have scored in UEFA competitions, UEFA Cup. On 12 September 1995, in the 1995–96 UEFA Cup, he scored for Alania against Liverpool.

International career
In 1987, Qosimov got his first international experience as a member of the Soviet U-17 football team and won with the national USSR team the FIFA U-16 championship in Canada, becoming one of the rising stars of the tournament. One year later, 1988 Mirdjalol with USSR U-18 won the European U-18 Football championship title

In 1994 Uzbekistan won the Asian Games and he was selected as the best midfield player in Asia; in 1993, 1998, 2001 and 2004 he was named the best football player in Uzbekistan. Kasimov captained the Uzbek national team for a long time in the 2000s. His last international match in the national team was against the Bahrain national football team in the World Cup 2006 qualifiers in Tashkent.

He played his final match in professional football on 2 June 2007 at MHSK Stadium in Tashkent against a combined team of European and Asian stars. The match brought together famous players such as Iranian Ali Daei, his counterpart Alireza Mansurian, and ex-Qatar international Mubarak Mustapha, his former trainer from Alania, Valeri Gazzaev, Russian footballers Viktor Onopko and Andrei Karyaka. It was the last match in his bright career that lasted more than 20 years and 67 appearances in the uniform of the national team and 31 goals.

Managing career

He started his trainer career as coach of Mash'al Mubarek, his last player station, where he retired as player. In 2006, he became co-trainer to Rauf Inileev of the Uzbekistan national and Uzbekistan Olympic football team. In December 2007 Kasymov was appointed as coach of Bunyodkor. In 2008, he managed to bring his club to the semi-final of the AFC Champions League in the club's first appearance in this tournament, which is considered to be the best international performance of Bunyodkor's history actually. Bunyodkor won in quarterfinal of tournament in two leg matches Saipa. On 25 September 2008 Brazilian legend, Zico was appointed as the new coach of Bunyodkor, Kasimov remained adviser-coach at club side.

On 16 September 2008, he became head coach of the Uzbekistan national football team for the qualification stage of the 2010 World cup. On 6 April 2010 he was replaced by Vadim Abramov as national team trainer. After Luiz Felipe Scolari left Bunyodkor in May 2010, Qosimov was named coach of the club again.

The authoritative football news website Goal.com named Qosimov as Best Coach of Month (May 2012) for the successful play of Bunyodkor in the AFC Champions League in that month.

On 4 June 2012, Qosimov was appointed as the new head coach of the Uzbekistan national football team for the second time after Vadim Abramov resigned from his post (lost 0-1 against Iran at home).

On 3 January 2013, IFFHS published its list of The World's best National Coach 2012 and Qosimov ranked 14th in the list among 17 coaches with 6 points, followed by Oleg Blokhin and the current coach of Switzerland, Ottmar Hitzfeld. In monthly survey Coach of the Month by Football Federation over the 2012 Kasymov was named best coach 6 times. UFF named Kasymov Coach of the Year on 21 January 2013.

Qosimov resigned his post as Bunyodkor's head coach on 5 April 2014 to concentrate on his work in the national team. He also led the U-23 national team for the 2014 Asian Games in Incheon.

On 22 December 2018 Qosimov was appointed as head coach of AGMK to prepare team for upcoming 2019 Uzbekistan Super League and qualification matches of 2019 AFC Champions League. On 12 February 2019 in 2nd preliminary round of 2019 AFC Champions League AGMK won Istiklol by 4:0. But in next play-off round one leg match on 19 February 2019 lost to Al-Nassr 0:4 und failed to qualify to group stage tournament.

Honours

Club
 Russian Premier League (1): 1995
 Russian Premier League runner-up (2): 1992, 1996
 Uzbekistan Super League (3): 1998, 2002, 2003
 Uzbekistan Super League runner-up (2): 1993, 2005
 Uzbek Cup (4): 1993, 1997, 2002, 2003

International
 FIFA U-17 World Cup (1): 1987
 UEFA U-18 Championship (1): 1988
 Asian Games (1): 1994

Individual
 Uzbekistan Footballer of the Year (4): 1993, 1998, 2001, 2004
 Uzbek League Topscorer: 1998 (22 goals)

Manager

Bunyodkor
 Uzbekistan Super League (3): 2010, 2011, 2013
 Uzbekistan Super League runner-up: 2012
 Uzbek Cup (3): 2010, 2012, 2013
 AFC Champions League semi-final (2): 2008, 2012

AGMK
 Uzbek Cup runner-up: 2019

Individual
 Uzbekistan Coach of the Year (1): 2012

Statistics

Player

Mirjalol Qosimov as Alania Vladikavkaz player performed 3 international appearances in UEFA tournaments. In the UEFA Cup season 1995–96 Kasymov played twice in a match against FC Liverpool won by albion team with 2–1 and scored an only goal of his team. In UEFA Champions League season 1996–97 qualifying round he played in a match against Rangers F.C. on 7 August 1996 won by Rangers with 3–1.

Statistics accurate as of match played 12 November 2004 in Russian Premier League.

International goalsScores and results list Uzbekistan's goal tally first.''

Notes

References

External links

1970 births
Living people
Uzbekistani footballers
Uzbekistani expatriate footballers
Uzbekistan international footballers
Uzbekistan national football team managers
2004 AFC Asian Cup players
Pakhtakor Tashkent FK players
FC Dinamo Minsk players
FC Spartak Vladikavkaz players
PFC Krylia Sovetov Samara players
Uzbekistan Super League players
Russian Premier League players
Expatriate footballers in Russia
Uzbekistani expatriate sportspeople in Russia
Expatriate footballers in the United Arab Emirates
Uzbekistani expatriate sportspeople in the United Arab Emirates
FC Bunyodkor managers
Soviet footballers
2015 AFC Asian Cup managers
Footballers at the 1998 Asian Games
Footballers at the 1994 Asian Games
Asian Games gold medalists for Uzbekistan
Asian Games medalists in football
Medalists at the 1994 Asian Games
Association football midfielders
Uzbekistani football managers